Sean McGinly is an American film director and screenwriter.  His film Two Days, starring Paul Rudd and Donal Logue, piqued the interest of Tom Hanks, who then agreed to produce McGinly's latest project, The Great Buck Howard, through his Playtone production company.  The film stars Hanks himself along with his son Colin Hanks, John Malkovich and Emily Blunt.

Filmography

Directing
The Great Buck Howard
Two Days
Brothers
The Truth About Juliet
Writer's Block

Writing
More Mercy
Venomous
Fugitive Mind
Sonic Impact
Evasive Action
Scorned 2
Strategic Command
The Confidence Man
Sexual Roulette
Time Under Fire

External links

American male screenwriters
American film directors
Year of birth missing (living people)
Living people